Ambloma brachyptera is a moth of the Symmocidae family. It is found on the Canary Islands.

The wingspan is about 9 mm. The forewings are hoary white, sprinkled with dark stony-grey scales. The hindwings are whitish grey.

Larvae were found under the leaves of Lotus sessilifolius.

References

Moths described in 1908
Symmocinae
Moths of Africa